Paul the Young Dude/The Best of Paul Gilbert is an album by Paul Gilbert of the heavy metal band Racer X and subsequently the hard rock band Mr. Big. It was initially released with the bonus CD Gilbert Hotel.

Track listing
All songs written by Paul Gilbert except where noted.
 "I'm Not Afraid of the Police" – 3:37
 "I Feel the Earth Move (Carole King song)" – 2:57 (Carole King)
 "My Religion" – 3:20
 "Down to Mexico" – 3:30
 "Superloud" – 4:28
 "Individually Twisted" – 4:06
 "Kate Is a Star" – 4:56 (Gilbert/Russ Parrish)
 "G.V.R.O." (Instrumental) – 1:01 (J. S. Bach)
 "I Like Rock" – 2:10
 "Let the Computer Decide" – 3:59
 "Girl Crazy" – 3:55 (Chip Z' Nuff/Donnie Vie)
 "Girls Who Can Read Your Mind" (Demo version) – 4:12
 "Girls Watching" – 3:44
 "Million Dollar Smile" (Live version) – 2:17
 "Karn Evil 9" (Live version) – 5:05 (Keith Emerson/Greg Lake/Peter Sinfield)
 "Gilberto Concerto" (Instrumental) – 7:48 (J. C. Bach)
 "The Second Loudest Guitar In the World" – 3:16
Track 2 originally recorded by Carole King on the album Tapestry.
Track 15 originally recorded by Emerson, Lake & Palmer on the album Brain Salad Surgery.
Tracks 8 & 16 arranged by Paul Gilbert.

Notes
Tracks 1, 2, 5, 12 & 17 were previously unreleased.

References
 http://www.allmusic.com/album/paul-the-young-dude-the-best-of-paul-gilbert-mw0000472444

Paul Gilbert albums
2003 greatest hits albums